The following is a comprehensive list of South Korean girl group, (G)I-dle live performances.

Tours

Concerts

Fan meetings

Showcases

Joint tours and concerts

Music festivals

Award shows

Television shows and specials

Notes

References

L
 
K-pop concerts by artist
Lists of concert tours
Lists of concert tours of South Korean artists
Lists of events in South Korea
South Korean music-related lists